Azadi Avenue or Azadi Street (Khiābān-e Azādi) is a trunk route in Tehran, Iran connecting Azadi Square to Enqelab Square.

The avenue's name means "Freedom" in Persian. Prior to the 1979 Revolution, the avenue was called Eisenhower avenue after the United States President Dwight D. Eisenhower. The avenue has been an iconic place for demonstrations and gatherings during the 1979 Revolution and after that in the Islamic republic era, was a meeting point for national gatherings and marches such as Bahman 22 Rallies that is being held annually in Tehran.

References

Streets in Tehran